RAMFest was a music festival that took place a couple of times in South African cities. RAMFest caters to electronic and indie rock music, that offers local acts.

Background
RAMFest was started by Dawid Fourie in 2007 in Worcester, Western Cape, South Africa featuring 20 local talents. Since then RAMFest has grown to multiple South African cities and was one of the largest music festivals in the country. The "RAM" in RAMFest stands for Real Alternative Music according to Fourie, thus making the full name of the festival the Real Alternative Music Festival.

Previous editions

 2007 – Twisted Playground (2 – 3 March) in Cape Town only.
 2008 – Beyond Boundaries (29 February – 2 March) in Cape Town only.
 2009 – Nekkies (27 February – 1 March) in Cape Town only.
2010 – The Real Alternative Music Festival (26–28 February; 6 March) in Cape Town and Johannesburg respectively.
2011 – RAMFest (4–5 March; 9 March; 12 March) in Cape Town, Durban and Johannesburg respectively.
2012 – A Day of Thunder (2 March; 3 March; 9 March; 10 March; 11 March) in Port Elizabeth, Bloemfontein, Durban, Johannesburg and Cape Town respectively.
2013 – Red Heart Rum presents: RAMFest (7–10 March; 8 March; 15 March; 15 March; 15–16 March) in Cape Town, Durban, Port Elizabeth, Durban (again) and Johannesburg respectively. It is to be noted that the first Durban show was for electronic acts while the second was for rock and metal acts.
2014 - Red Heart Rum presents: RAMFest (6–9 March) in Cape Town and Johannesburg.

Performers

The following table lists the notable artists that have performed at RAMFest.

Controversies
In 2012, a chain mail was circulated, implying that RAMFest had a Satanic involvement. As a result, RAMFest had trouble organising another venue for the Bloemfontein leg of the fest and it was cancelled there due to pressure from religious groups.

In December 2012, the metalcore band As I Lay Dying pulled out from the RAMFest 2013 line-up due to being double booked to support The Devil Wears Prada on their tour. The Devil Wears Prada's tour dates conflicted with RAMFest 2013's dates, making it impossible for As I Lay Dying to have performed at Ramfest 2013.

During Bring Me the Horizon's set at the Johannesburg leg of the festival for 2013, tear gas was thrown into the crowd which caused fans to cough and tear up.

RAMFest announced that the 2015 edition of the festival was cancelled, citing the lack of suitable acts for the line up as the reason for its cancellation.

RAMFest announced that the 2016 edition will not feature any international acts, and cancelled the festival.

See also
In The City
Oppikoppi
Musical Performance
Music of South Africa
Splashy Fen

References

Rock festivals in South Africa
Electronic music festivals in South Africa
Festivals in Cape Town
Festivals in Johannesburg
Festivals in Durban